Hong Kong Studies (Traditional Chinese: 香港研究) is a biannual peer-reviewed open-access academic journal covering Hong Kong studies in Chinese and English. It is published by The Chinese University of Hong Kong Press and was established in 2018. The editors-in-chief are Professor Michael O'Sullivan, Professor Eddie Tay (Chinese University of Hong Kong), Dr. Michael Tsang (Newcastle University) and Tammy Ho Lai Ming (Baptist University of Hong Kong).

The journal is the first academic journal covering exclusively Hong Kong studies.

References

External links

Biannual journals
Publications established in 2018
Multilingual journals
Hong Kong studies
Area studies journals
Chinese University of Hong Kong